The Bush Mill Railway was a   gauge miniature railway, situated  from Port Arthur, in Tasmania. It opened in 1986.

Route 
The Bush Mill Railway climbed steeply through a series of loops and zig zags up a hillside, then across a spectacular Serpentine Bridge. A half-size replica of the K1 was constructed to operate on the line in 1990.  The prototype K1 was the world's first Garratt locomotive, built for the North-East Dundas Tramway on Tasmania's west coast.

Settlement 
A replica settlement was established which featured a 19th-century sawmill and a number of items which were directly related to the logging tramways which once dotted much of Tasmania.

It closed on 30 June 2004.

Locomotives

The Railway also had 5 semi-open coaches and 2 coal wagons, these became part of the collection at the Cleethorpes Coast Light Railway and the coaches have now moved on to the Sherwood Forest Railway

References 

Rail transport in Tasmania
15 in gauge railways in Australia
History of transport in Tasmania